The Return of Martin Guerre is a 1982 French film directed by , and starring Gérard Depardieu. It was based on a case of imposture in 16th century France, involving Martin Guerre.

Synopsis
The film relates a historical case of alleged identity theft. Martin Guerre leaves his young wife in a small French village to go fight in a war, and to travel. Eight or nine years later, Martin (played by Depardieu) returns to resume his life. The man is initially acknowledged and welcomed by the wife, family, and friends because he knows the intimate details of his former life.

As time passes, however, vagabonds identify Martin as Arnaud of the neighbouring village of Tilh, but the villagers dismiss these claims as lies. But when Martin makes a demand for money he's owed by his uncle, the uncle is outraged and attacks Martin. This leads to a trial on his identity, with his life at stake, since if he is not Martin he and Martin's wife Bertrande are adulterers and their children bastards. This trial constitutes most of the film.

Martin argues well, and the villagers are divided on whether the man is in fact Martin, Bertrande siding with him. After several elevations of the proceedings up to a court in the Parlement, the judge, Jean de Coras, prepares to acquit Martin primarily on the strength of the testimony of Bertrande.

At the last minute, another witness appears in court, bearing an even stronger resemblance to the young Martin and casting everything into doubt once more. The impostor confesses that he was a soldier with the real Martin, who said he was never going back to his village, upon which the impostor decided to take his place. Even Bertrande changes her mind and says the new witness is Martin. Arnaud is sentenced to death.

Some time later, De Coras visits the village to tell Bertrande that she has been acquitted and is innocent of conspiracy with Arnaud. But he has deduced that she recognized the impostor from the very beginning and asks her why she claimed he was Martin. She says that he was a better husband and man, and they had a good life together. De Coras asks her then why she changed her mind at the last minute. She says she saw in Arnaud's eyes that the case had become hopeless and that he wanted her to feign ignorance so as to live for herself and her children.

Arnaud is led to the gallows, repenting all the while. A voiceover closes the historical framework by mentioning that de Coras was executed some years later for his Protestant beliefs.

Reception
The film was nominated for Best Foreign Language Film by the U.S. National Board of Review of Motion Pictures.

Book
In 1983, a book of the same name was published by Natalie Zemon Davis, an American historian of early modern France and professor at Princeton University.  She had served as a consultant and helped write the screenplay for the film.

Remake and musical
Sommersby is a 1993 Hollywood remake of the film in English, transposed to the American Civil War and starring Richard Gere and Jodie Foster.

A West End (London) musical produced by Cameron Mackintosh, Martin Guerre, was loosely based on the film with additional material from historical accounts.  Again, the historical setting is transposed, in this case to the period of religious turmoil between the Huguenots and the Catholics in sixteenth century France.

The first feature film from East Timor, A Guerra Da Beatriz ("Beatriz's War") was released in 2013. It is a re-telling of the story of Martin Guerre, but set in the 1980s, during the Indonesian occupation of Timor Leste. It stars Irim Tolentino, who co-wrote the script with the director, Bety Reis.

Cast and roles
 Gérard Depardieu - "Martin Guerre" (Arnaud du Tilh)
 Nathalie Baye - Bertrande de Rols
 Maurice Barrier - Uncle Pierre Guerre
 Bernard-Pierre Donnadieu - Martin Guerre
 Isabelle Sadoyan - Catherine Boëre
 Rose Thiéry - Raimonde de Rols
 Chantal Deruaz - Jeanne
 Maurice Jacquemont - Judge Rieux
 Roger Planchon - Jean de Coras
 Dominique Pinon - Antoine
 Philippe Babin - Jacques
 Valérie Chassigneux - Guillemette
 Adrien Duquesne - Sanxi Guerre
 Tchéky Karyo - Augustin

Awards
Nominee Best Costume Design Academy Award (Anne-Marie Marchand)
Nominee Best Foreign Language Film BAFTA award
Winner Best Original Screenplay Cesar Award (Jean-Claude Carriere, Daniel Vigne}
Winner Best Music Cesar Award (Michel Portal)
Winner Best Production Design Cesar Award (Alain Negre}
Nominee Most Promising Actor Cesar Award {Dominique Pinon)
Winner Best Foreign Film National Board of Review
Winner Best Actor National Society of Film Critics (Gérard Depardieu)
Winner Best Foreign Film Kansas City Film Critics Circle

Notes and links

See also
Middle Ages in film
Microhistory

References

Bibliography
 Davis, Natalie Zemon. The Return of Martin Guerre. Cambridge: Harvard University Press, 1983. 
 Lewis, Janet. The Wife of Martin Guerre. Swallow Press, 1967. .

External links

1982 films
1980s biographical drama films
French biographical drama films
1980s French-language films
Films about identity theft
Films set in France
Films set in the 16th century
Films with screenplays by Jean-Claude Carrière
1980s historical drama films
French historical drama films
1980s French films